The 2022 Speedway of Nations 2 (SON2) was the 18th FIM Team Under-21 World Championship season. The one-off final took place on 29 July 2022 at the Vojens Speedway Center in Vojens, Denmark.

Despite the change of name to Speedway of Nations 2 (SON2), the format remained the same as 2021 with seven teams - Australia, Czech Republic, Denmark, Great Britain, Latvia, Poland and Sweden competing for the title.

Defending champions Poland won their 15th Team Under-21 World Championship and ninth in succession. They topped the scoring charts during the main meeting, and then won the Grand Final against the Czech Republic. The Czechs were in a winning position until Petr Chlupáč suffered mechanic issues on the third lap. Great Britain finished third.

Final 
  Vojens
 29 July 2022

Grand Final Qualifier

Grand Final

See also 
 2022 Speedway of Nations
 2022 SGP2

References 

2022
World Team Junior
Team Speedway Junior World Championship
Speedway of Nations 2